Robert Preston may refer to:

Robert Preston (actor) (1918–1987), American actor
Robert Preston (military lawyer)
Robert Preston (American politician) (1929-2021), American politician, New Hampshire State Senator
Robert Preston, 1st Baron Gormanston (died 1396), Anglo-Irish nobleman, statesman and judge
Robert Preston (Westmorland MP), British MP for Westmorland, 1421
Robert Preston, 1st Viscount Gormanston (1435–1503), Irish politician
Sir Robert Preston, 6th Baronet (1740–1834), British MP for Dover, 1784–1790
Robert E. Preston (1836–1911), Director of the U.S. Mint, 1893–98
Robert K. Preston (1953–2009), White House intruder
Robert Henry Preston (1840–1926), Ontario doctor and political figure
Rob Preston (born 1982), American professional basketball player
Robert Preston (Coronation Street), fictional character in the British TV soap opera Coronation Street

See also
Robert Peston (born 1960), political editor for ITV News, and former business editor for BBC News